Blacking may refer to:

Blacking (polish), a nineteenth-century shoe polish
Blacking up, putting on a style of theatrical makeup to take on the appearance of certain archetypes of American racism
Blacking (cryptography) In NSA jargon, encryption devices are often called blackers, because they convert red signals to black
Sanitization (classified information)

People with the surname
 John Blacking (1928–1990), British ethnomusicologist and anthropologist

See also
 Blackening (disambiguation)